Dugald is a community in Manitoba, Canada, located 22 kilometres east of Winnipeg at the junction of PTH 15 and Provincial Road 206 in the Rural Municipality of Springfield.  It was the site of a railway accident in 1947.

In the Dugald train disaster of September 1947, a Canadian National Railway passenger train consisting of older wooden-bodied passenger cars collided with a transcontinental passenger train made up of newer steel cars, resulting in severe damage and fatalities on the older train.  This accident led to the retirement of the less crashworthy wooden cars.

Dugald was also the home to the Costume Museum, a museum dedicated to Canadian fashion. The museum relocated to downtown Winnipeg in 2006.

Dugald is the birthplace of former National Hockey League goaltender Trevor Kidd, who played in 387 regular season games for four teams.

Demographics 

See also
 Lists of rail accidents

References

External links

 Town of Dugald (archived)

Designated places in Manitoba
Unincorporated communities in Eastman Region, Manitoba